The German term Herrschaft (plural: Herrschaften) covers a broad semantic field and only the context will tell whether it means, "rule", "power", "dominion", "authority", "territory" or "lordship". In its most abstract sense, it refers to power relations in general while more concretely it may refer to the individuals or institutions that exercise that power. Finally, in a spatial sense in the Holy Roman Empire, it refers to a territory over which this power is exercised.

The Herrschaft as a territory

The Herrschaft, whose closest equivalent was the French seigneurie, usually translated as "lordship" in English, denoted a specific area of land with rights over both the soil and its inhabitants. While the lord (Herr) was often a noble, it could also be a commoner such as a burgher, or a corporate entity such as a bishopric, a cathedral chapter, an abbey, a hospice or a town.

Most lordships were mediate, which meant that their lords and inhabitants owed allegiance to a territorial ruler — such as a duke, a margrave, a count, a prince, a prince-elector or a prince-bishop — who  exercised a number of sovereign rights over them, including high justice, taxation and military conscription.  However, several lordships were immediate, having gained that coveted status usually at some time during the Middle Ages.

See also
 Heerlijkheid
 Particuliere landerij, 17th-century Dutch East Indies (now Indonesia)

References

Bibliography
Hanns Hubert Hofmann: Quellen zum Verfassungsorganismus des Heiligen Römischen Reiches Deutscher Nation 1495–1815, Darmstadt 1976.

German feudalism